The A48 is a trunk road in Great Britain running from the A40 at Highnam,  west of Gloucester, England, to the A40 at Carmarthen, Wales. Before the Severn Bridge opened on 8 September 1966, it was a major route between England and South Wales. For most of its route, it runs almost parallel to the M4 motorway. During times of high winds at the Severn Bridge, the A48 is used as part of the diversion route and is still marked as a Holiday Route.

From Gloucester, the A48 runs through the villages of Minsterworth, Westbury-on-Severn, connects to a link road to Cinderford in the Forest of Dean then through Newnham, Blakeney and since 1995, bypassing Lydney on the west bank of the River Severn. It crosses the England–Wales border at Chepstow and continues westwards close to the South Wales coast passing Newport, Cardiff, Cowbridge, Bridgend, Pyle, Port Talbot, Neath and Swansea, before terminating at the junction with the A40 near the centre of Carmarthen.

There is a motorway section (the A48(M)) which is a spur from the M4 running from junction 29 on the west side of Newport. The A48(M) has no junction options at either end; it leads to limited-access junctions. Near the east of Cardiff, at St Mellons, it ends by flowing onto the A48 (Eastern Avenue) and through Cardiff. At St Mellons it runs continuously into a further  of the dual-carriageway A48, which also features (albeit narrow) hard shoulders. The original A48 continues to link Newport and Cardiff.

Highnam to Newport
The A48 from Highnam to Newport runs adjacent to the River Severn. After running through a series of villages, it crosses the England–Wales border at Chepstow. The section between Higham and Chepstow is still a primary route of some importance for the Forest of Dean. 
From the M4 Motorway at J15 near Swindon, traffic is directed for Wales if it is over the Severn Bridge weight limit of 44 tonnes. Traffic is directed onto the A419, then onto the A417 after Cirencester, and at Gloucester, onto the A40. This road has some speed cameras, as there have previously been incidents here, and have been erected to prevent them from happening again. During busy periods, such as the Severn Bore, this road may become busy with parked cars near the river's edge. Apart from morning and evening rush hours, the road is generally quite empty and free running, with no heavy traffic reports. The road also runs next to the Forest of Dean. The woods may be viewed from the roadside, as may the hills of the Dean. There is a level crossing in Lydney. Until Chepstow, there is a height limit under the low railway bridges. Tall vehicles are directed to Newport on the A40. For some parts of this route, short distance dual carriageways occur, especially on steep hills. 
At Chepstow, the road links Gloucestershire with Monmouthshire. The road runs through Chepstow. There is access to the Forest of Dean in Chepstow. At the end of the road in Chepstow (at the roundabout), the Primary Route ends here, and it meets the A466, a road that provides access to the Wye Valley and to the M48 motorway, originally the M4. Access to the M4 is available on this road. The A48 becomes a secondary route here, and continues bypassing Caldicot, Caerwent and Langstone.

The A48 then continues to M4 junction 24, where vehicles exceeding the height limit may rejoin the A48. The A449 provides access to Usk and the A40 near Raglan. When the Severn Bridge is closed in bad weather conditions, the traffic is directed onto the A449. After this roundabout, the road follows through to Newport. There are some minor routes that take you to Newport City Centre, but the main route is the A4042, leading directly to the centre and Caerleon. This is after the Newport International Sports Village , a sports village with facilities including a Swimming Pool, Tennis Courts, Football Stadium, Cricket Pitch, Velodrome and many more facilities. Passing through Newport, there are views of the industrial town, with views of historic features such as the Transporter Bridge. The road then reaches the M4 again, at J28.

History of the road number

The original (1923) route of the A48 was Worcester to Carmarthen via Malvern, Ledbury, Ross-on-Wye, Monmouth, Newport, Cardiff, Bridgend, Neath and Llanelli. In 1935 it was rerouted east of Newport, replacing the A437 between Newport and Gloucester.  The road from Worcester to Newport became part of the A449, apart from the section between Ross and Monmouth (which became part of the A40).

Road safety
In June 2008, the  GloucesterChepstow stretch of the A48 was named as the most dangerous road in South West England. This single carriageway had 45 fatal and serious injury collisions between 2004 and 2006, and was rated as medium risk in the EuroRAP report published by the Road Safety Foundation.

On 6 March 2023, five people were found after they had been missing for two days. Three of the five were found dead following a believed car crash after their car was found on the A48 in St Mellons, with the other two injured.

References

Roads in Bridgend County Borough
Roads in Cardiff
Roads in Carmarthenshire
Roads in Gloucestershire
Roads in Monmouthshire
Roads in Neath Port Talbot
Roads in Newport, Wales
Roads in Swansea
Roads in the Vale of Glamorgan
Constituent roads of European route E30